The Revierderby is the name given to any association football match between two clubs in the Ruhr region – also known in German as the , a contraction of Bergbaurevier (mining area) – in North Rhine-Westphalia, but almost always refers to the derby between Borussia Dortmund and FC Schalke 04. Outside Germany, it is often referred to as the Ruhr derby.

A local derby between other Ruhr teams (for example VfL Bochum, MSV Duisburg, or Rot-Weiss Essen) is often called a kleines Revierderby (minor Revier derby).

History and results

1925–1936: The beginning
The rivalry began with a 4–2 Schalke victory on 3 May 1925. Schalke's style of play at the time was described by a newspaper of the era as a "wandering ball from man to man" in a series of short, flat passes. The Schalker Kreisel (literally: "Schalke spinning top") was born. Schalke won all three matches played in the years 1925–1927. The two teams did not meet again until the creation of the Gauliga in 1936.

Results 
Schalke: 3 victories, 0 draws, 0 losses

3 May 1925: Schalke 4–2 Dortmund (in Herne)
24 October 1926: Schalke 2–0 Dortmund 
16 January 1927: Dortmund 2–7 Schalke

1936–1944: Gauliga era
With the creation of the Gauliga in 1936, Dortmund developed its intense rivalry with Schalke. Schalke was the most successful German club of the era, six of the club's to date seven German Championships and one Cup victory date back to the years of 1933 to 1945. Schalke dominated the early meetings, winning 14 matches, and losing only once, with one match played to a draw. August Lenz's goal on 14 November 1943 secured Dortmund's first ever victory against Schalke.

Results
Schalke: 14 victories, 1 draw, 1 loss

Season 1936–37
20 December 1936: Schalke 4–1 Dortmund 
7 March 1937: Dortmund 0–7 Schalke 
Season 1937–38
30 January 1938: Dortmund 3–3 Schalke
6 March 1938: Schalke 4–0 Dortmund 
Season 1938–39
18 September 1938: Schalke 6–0 Dortmund 
12 March 1939: Dortmund 3–7 Schalke 
Season 1939–40
10 December 1939: Schalke 9–0 Dortmund 
4 February 1940: Dortmund 0–7 Schalke 
Season 1940–41
20 October 1940: Schalke 10–0 Dortmund 
2 February 1941: Dortmund 0–2 Schalke 
Season 1941–42
30 November 1941: Dortmund 1–6 Schalke 
22 March 1942: Schalke 6–1 Dortmund 
Season 1942–43
29 November 1942: Schalke 2–0 Dortmund 
26 December 1942: Dortmund 0–7 Schalke 
Season 1943–44
14 November 1943: Dortmund 1–0 Schalke 
27 February 1944: Schalke 4–1 Dortmund

1945–1947: post-war era
Dortmund win the Westphalia championship final 3–2 over Schalke, ending Schalke's domination in the region.

Results
Dortmund: 1 win, 0 draws, 0 losses

18 May 1947: Dortmund 3–2 Schalke (in Herne)

1947–1963: Oberliga era
The years 1947–63 continued to be a reversal of fortune for Dortmund, winning 9 of the first 13 Revierderbies during this era, and losing only 7 of 32 overall. Dortmund also won three Oberliga championships in these years.

Results
Dortmund: 15 wins, 10 draws, 7 losses

Season 1947–48
21 September 1947: Schalke 1–1 Dortmund
18 January 1948: Dortmund 1–0 Schalke 
Season 1948–49
26 September 1948: Dortmund 5–2 Schalke 
30 January 1949: Schalke 0–1 Dortmund 
Season 1949–50
16 October 1949: Dortmund 5–1 Schalke 
12 March 1950: Schalke 2–1 Dortmund 
Season 1950–51
26 November 1950: Dortmund 3–0 Schalke 
22 April 1951: Schalke 0–0 Dortmund
Season 1951–52
9 September 1951: Schalke 3–0 Dortmund 
20 January 1952: Dortmund 3–0 Schalke 
Season 1952–53
7 December 1952: Schalke 0–1 Dortmund 
19 April 1953: Dortmund 1–0 Schalke 
Season 1953–54
29 November 1953: Schalke 0–3 Dortmund 
4 April 1954: Dortmund 3–4 Schalke 
Season 1954–55
5 December 1954: Dortmund 0–0 Schalke
17 April 1955: Schalke 0–2 Dortmund 
Season 1955–56
26 November 1955: Schalke 1–3 Dortmund 
8 April 1956: Dortmund 0–2 Schalke 
Season 1956–57
25 August 1956: Dortmund 3–2 Schalke 
12 January 1957: Schalke 3–3 Dortmund
Season 1957–58
1 September 1957: Schalke 2–2 Dortmund
5 January 1958: Dortmund 1–1 Schalke
Season 1958–59
12 October 1958: Dortmund 1–3 Schalke 
22 February 1959: Schalke 1–5 Dortmund 
Season 1959–60
20 September 1959: Schalke 5–0 Dortmund 
24 January 1960: Dortmund 6–3 Schalke 
Season 1960–61
2 October 1960: Dortmund 0–0 Schalke 
5 March 1961: Schalke 2–2 Dortmund 
Season 1961–62
7 April 1962: Schalke 5–3 Dortmund 
25 November 1961: Dortmund 2–2 Schalke 
Season 1962–63
2 December 1962: Schalke 1–1 Dortmund 
28 April 1963: Dortmund 1–0 Schalke

1963–present: Bundesliga and German Cup era
The creation of the Bundesliga in 1963 began with Dortmund continuing their winning ways, by taking 8 of the first 10 meetings.

Schalke's 1–0 victory on 20 April 1968, saw the return of Schalke's fortune and the fall of Dortmund. After Dortmund's 0–3 defeat on 4 March 1972, and subsequent relegation from the league, the teams did not play each other again until 1975.

After Dortmund's return to the Bundesliga, Lothar Huber's goal in the 87th minute on 5 November 1977 gave Dortmund their first victory over Schalke in nearly ten years. The following years belonged to Dortmund, winning eleven matches to Schalke's six, culminating in a 3–2 victory in a German Cup match on 9 December 1988. Schalke's relegation after the 1987–88 season resulted in these teams not playing again until the 1991–92 campaign.

Schalke's next Revierderby was remarkable. With Schalke managing only three goals in their first four matches after returning to the Bundesliga, Dortmund seemed assured of continuing their success. On 24 August 1991, in front of over 70,000 fans, former Dortmund midfielder Ingo Anderbrügge scored in the 2nd minute to put Schalke ahead 1–0. However, Dortmund equalized in the 36th and the 1st half finished with the scored tied 1–1. In the 2nd half, Schalke exploded, stunning Dortmund 5–2. Dortmund's overall success that season eclipsed the defeat, winning the next Revierderby 2–0, and finishing the league in second place that year, tied in points, but losing out to VfB Stuttgart on goal differential.

The following years saw Schalke holding a slim advantage since 1991, winning 11, drawing 14, and losing 8 of the matches. Despite Schalke's recent Revierderby success, including losing only five derbies since 1999 (until 14. April 2012), Dortmund holds the advantage in overall success during this era, winning five Bundesliga championships (1994–95, 1995–96, 2001–02, 2010–11 and 2011–12), one German Cup (2012), one UEFA Champions League competition (1997), and one Intercontinental Cup (1997) since 1995, while Schalke won the UEFA Cup once (1997) and the German Cup three times (2001, 2002 and 2011).

Recent years have seen the first-ever Bundesliga derby aired live on free TV (January 2004, shown on ARD), as well as two famous Dortmund victories. One of these, in 2005, ended a nearly seven-year undefeated streak for Schalke in the derby, while the other, in May 2007, took on almost traumatic proportions, as Schalke lost the derby and the league lead, which they had held for three months, on the penultimate day of the season in Dortmund. After each of these victories, Borussia Dortmund took the unprecedented step of selling specially-decorated replica shirts to commemorate the occasion. In 2008, Dortmund fan groups celebrated Schalke's fifty years without a league title.

Results in Bundesliga
Overall, Dortmund leads the Bundesliga series with 36 wins, 30 draws, and 32 losses.

 	

Schalke in Bundesliga at home

Dortmund in Bundesliga at home

Results in cup matches

Statistics

Overall match statistics

Head-to-head ranking in Bundesliga

• Total: Dortmund with 32 higher finishes, Schalke with 16 (as of end of 2020–21 season).

Player records

Notable matches
First meeting: 3 May 1925 (Schalke 4–2 Dortmund)
First Schalke victory: 3 May 1925 (Schalke 4–2 Dortmund)
First match played to a draw: 30 January 1938 (Dortmund 3–3 Schalke)
Most goals (both teams): 12 March 1939 (Dortmund 3–7 Schalke)
Most goals for Schalke: 20 October 1940 (Schalke 10–0 Dortmund)
First Dortmund victory: 14 November 1943 (Dortmund 1–0 Schalke)
First scoreless match: 22 April 1951 (Schalke 0–0 Dortmund)
Most goals for Dortmund: 26 February 1966 (Dortmund 7–0 Schalke)
Schalke's return: 24 August 1991 (Schalke 5–2 Dortmund)
Lehmann's miracle goal: 19 December 1997 (Dortmund 2–2 Schalke)
Last minute Dortmund disappointment: 30 January 2004 (Dortmund 0–1 Schalke)
End of Schalke's streak: 14 May 2005 (Schalke 1–2 Dortmund)
Schalke's championship dream falls apart: 12 May 2007 (Dortmund 2–0 Schalke)
Dortmund turns a 0–3 into a 3–3 during the last 21 minutes: 13 September 2008 (Dortmund 3–3 Schalke)
Schalke turns a 0–4 after 25 minutes into a 4–4: 25 November 2017 (Dortmund 4–4 Schalke)
Dortmund title hopes dented and incurs 2 red cards: 27 April 2019 (Dortmund 2–4 Schalke)
The first Bundesliga match to return from the enforced COVID-19 break: 16 May 2020 (Dortmund 4–0 Schalke)

Honours

Players who played for both clubs

Dortmund, then Schalke
 1977:  Manfred Ritschel (via Kickers Offenbach, then 1. FC Kaiserslautern)
 1981:  Theo Bücker (via MSV Duisburg, then Al-Ittihad)
 1982:  Werner Lorant (via Rot-Weiss Essen, 1. FC Saarbrücken and Eintracht Frankfurt)
 1986:  Jürgen Wegmann (then back to Dortmund in 1989, after Bayern Munich)
 1988:  Ingo Anderbrügge
 1995:  Marco Kurz
 2000:  Andreas Möller
 2010:  Christoph Metzelder (via Real Madrid)
 2013:  Felipe Santana
 2013:  Kevin-Prince Boateng (via Portsmouth, then Milan)

Schalke, then Dortmund
 1965:  Reinhard Libuda (then back to Schalke in 1968)
 1975:  Gerd Kasperski (via Preußen Münster, Arminia Bielefeld and Hannover 96)
 1978:  Peter Endrulat (via SpVgg Erkenschwick)
 1979:  Norbert Dörmann
 1979:  Paul Holz (via VfL Bochum, Hannover 96 and VfL Bochum again)
 1980:  Jürgen Sobieray (via DSC Wanne-Eickel)
 1980:  Rüdiger Abramczik (then back to Schalke in 1987, after 1. FC Nürnberg, Galatasaray S.K. and Rot-Weiß Oberhausen)
 1980:  Rolf Rüssmann
 1983:  Ulrich Bittcher
 1987:  Gerhard Kleppinger
 1993:  Steffen Freund
 1995:  Harald Schumacher (via Fenerbahçe, then Bayern Munich)
 1999:  Jens Lehmann (via Milan)
 2008:  Tamás Hajnal (via Sint-Truidense, 1. FC Kaiserslautern and Karlsruher SC)

Other revierderbies

Match statistics in Bundesliga

References

External links
Dortmund vs. Schalke page on footballderbies.com
FC Schalke 04 official team site (in German, English, Russian, Japanese and Chinese)
Borussia Dortmund official team site (in German, English and Japanese)
German football statistics and information (in German)

FC Schalke 04
Borussia Dortmund
Association football rivalries in Germany
Ruhr
Football in North Rhine-Westphalia